Eisha Stephen Atieno Odhiambo (1945 – 25 February 2009)) was a Kenyan academic born in Muhoroni, known for his contributions to the understanding of dangers inherent in politics of knowledge and sociology of power. Dr Odhiambo was professor of history at Rice University in the United States, where he led in the study of cultures. He was educated at Makerere University in Uganda and the University of Nairobi in Kenya.

Odhiambo retired from Rice University due to illness and moved back with his wife to their home in Ndere, Siaya, Kenya, before his 2009 death at the Aga Khan Hospital in Kisumu.

Bibliography
History of East Africa.  (Addison-Wesley Longman Ltd, 10/01/1978)
Mau Mau and Nationhood: Arms, Authority, and Narration, ed. John Lonsdale,  (Ohio University Press - 01/01/2003)
Risks Of Knowledge: Investigations Into The Death Of The Hon. Minister John Robert Ouko In Kenya, 1990 (with David William Cohen)   (Ohio University Press, 11/01/2004)

References
Rice University profile

1945 births
2009 deaths
Kenyan historians
Historians of Africa
Kenyan writers
Makerere University alumni
University of Nairobi alumni
Rice University faculty
20th-century historians
20th-century Kenyan writers
21st-century Kenyan writers